Prithi Chand (Gurmukhi: ਪ੍ਰਿਥੀ ਚੰਦ; 1558–April 1618) was the eldest son of Guru Ram Das – the fourth Guru of Sikhism, and the eldest brother of Guru Arjan – the fifth Guru. He wanted to inherit the Sikh Guruship from his father, who instead favored and appointed his youngest son the 18-year old Arjan Dev as the next Guru. Chand was embittered and notably started one of the major subsects of early Sikhism. This subsect came to be labelled as the Minas, literally "unscrupulous scoundrels", by his competition. According to The Encyclopaedia Britannica, Prithi Chand was "distinctly hostile" of his brother's appointment as Guru. His unscrupulous means and support for atrocities committed by the Mughal empire, did not find favour with Guru Ram Das, who bestowed the Guruship on Guru Arjan. Modern scholars have called his movement as one of the unorthodox sects that emerged in the history of Sikhism.

Chand was an accomplished devotional poet, however, he did not use his talents to good means. He created a parallel scripture which included the hymns of earlier Gurus and his own poetry. His spiritual discourses used teachings of Sikh Gurus but were aimed to attract his own following and the official support of the Mughal Empire. His followers forcibly and by covert means, gained control of the Sikh holy city of Amritsar and neighboring region, while Guru Hargobind – the sixth Guru of Sikhism, had to relocate his Guruship to the Himalayan Shivalik foothills. Chand and his followers tried to establish his own Guruship opposing Guru Arjan and Guru Hargobind as the official followers of Guru Nanak – the founder of Sikhism. His poetic abilities and use of hymns of Guru Nanak for his ulterior motives is believed to have likely triggered Guru Arjan to compose the official first manuscript of the Adi Granth.

There was a bitter attempt by Prithi Chand and his followers to oppose Guru Arjan for three generations. He conspired with Chandu Shah, an official from Lahore, against the Guru at the suggestion of his wife, Karmo. In contemporary Sikhism, the followers and movement led by Prithi Chand are considered as "dissenters". In the hagiographies and Sikh history, Chand is accused of attempting to poison Hargobind when he was a young boy. He and his descendants – his son, Manohar Das (Meharban) and Mehrban's son, Harji (Hariji) conspired with the Muslim leaders such as Sulahi Khan to hurt and end the later Sikh Gurus, as well prevent them from entering Amritsar. However, Minas' literature does not support these allegations, on the contrary presenting Chand as a devout supporter of Guru Arjan and suggesting a likely "bias" against Chand.

Prithi Chand established his Guruship in Kotha Guru (about 35 kilometers northeast of Bathinda). He died there in 1618. His son Manohar Das, popularly known as Meharban, was attached to both his father Prithi Chand and his uncle Guru Arjan. Meharban succeeded Chand-led Sikh sect's fellowship. He was also a literary talent and a "luminary among medieval Sikh and Panjabi litterateurs" states Syan, and he composed hymns under the pen name of Prithi Chand. Prithi Chand and his early Sikh sect claimed to have the Guru Harsahai pothi, the earliest compiled Sikh scripture from the time of Guru Nanak. According to the literature of the Miharvan Sikhs, the pothi was given to Prithi Chand by Guru Arjan and this was in part the reason they claimed authenticity of their hymns and movement.

The wars of Guru Gobind Singh against the Muslim commanders and the rise of the Khalsa brotherhood ultimately ended the control of Amritsar by the followers of Prithi Chand. His movement and the "Minas" sect thereafter became largely extinct. According to Gurinder Singh Mann, the Sodhis of Guru Harsahai (35 kilometers west of Faridkot) and of Malwa region are the descendants of the Prithi Chand and Miharvan movement.

References

Sikh gurus
1558 births
1618 deaths
Punjabi people
Sikh groups and sects